Ernest Harvey Perry (16 January 1908–23 October 1996) was an English first-class cricketer who played ten games for Worcestershire between 1933 and 1946. He also appeared in the Minor Counties Championship for Staffordshire between 1926 and 1946.

Perry's highest score in first-class cricket was the 46 he made near the end of his career, against Glamorgan in 1946,
although in 1934 he had scored 157 for Staffordshire against Cheshire at Stoke-on-Trent.
His best first-class bowling return was the 5-42 he claimed in the first innings against Leicestershire at Kidderminster in 1933.

Notes

References
Ernest Perry from CricketArchive

English cricketers
Worcestershire cricketers
1908 births
1996 deaths
Staffordshire cricketers